The Pacific D-8 is an American, single-seat, high-wing glider, that was designed by Ken Coward and made available as plans for amateur construction.

Design and development
The D-8 was conceived by Coward as an easy-to-build and inexpensive all-aluminium glider with good performance, that could be flown with or without a canopy. Later flight testing of a completed D-8 showed that the hoped-for performance was not achieved as the glide ratio was measured at just 17:1 with no canopy fitted.

Coward designed the D-8 and sold plans, but never built a prototype. The first D-8 was built by Klaus Hill and Bruno Hauffe who purchased plans in 1963. Virl Kimber made the first flight of the aircraft in May 1964. Early aircraft built showed that the ailerons and rudder were too small and that the wing was set at too high an angle of incidence for safety and most were subsequently modified. The plans were changed to incorporate larger ailerons.

At least five were completed, including one built by members of the Lockhaven Glider Club in Pennsylvania. That same aircraft was used for extensive flight testing by a subsequent owner to accurately measure its performance. One was built as a powered motor glider.

Specifications (D-8)

See also

References

1960s United States sailplanes
Aircraft first flown in 1964